Mafeking is a local urban district in the Rural Municipality of Mountain, Manitoba, Canada.

The town shares a name with a city in Mafeking, South Africa.

References 

Local urban districts in Manitoba

Unincorporated communities in Parkland Region, Manitoba